Matton-et-Clémency is a commune in the Ardennes department in northern France.

Points of interest
Arboretum de Matton-Clémency

See also
Communes of the Ardennes department

References

Communes of Ardennes (department)
Ardennes communes articles needing translation from French Wikipedia